Gregory Samuel Sorbara (born September 4, 1946) is a former politician in Ontario, Canada. He was a Liberal member of the Legislative Assembly of Ontario from 1985 to 1995, and again from 2001 to 2012 who represented ridings north of Toronto in the city of Vaughan. Sorbara served as a cabinet minister in the governments of David Peterson and Dalton McGuinty.

He resigned from cabinet October 11, 2005, following a police investigation involving his family's real estate development firm and was reinstated on May 23, 2006 after a judge ruled that there was no cause for including Sorbara's name on a search warrant. Sorbara chaired the party's successful 2007 election campaign but announced on October 26, 2007 that he was leaving the cabinet to spend more time with his family but would continue as a backbench MPP. On August 1, 2012, Sorbara announced that he was retiring from the legislature but would stay on as chair of the Liberal's election campaign. Sorbara has been Chancellor of York University since June 2014, succeeding Roy McMurtry.

Family life and legal career
Sorbara was born in Toronto, Ontario in 1946. His father, Sam Sorbara, immigrated to Canada from Italy in the 1920s. Sorbara graduated from St. Michael's College School and attended University of Toronto for four years but left without graduating. In 1967 he joined the Company of Young Canadians in Vancouver, where he met his future partner, Kate Barlow. Later, he completed his education at York University and Osgoode Hall Law School, and began to practise law. His daughter Martina Sorbara is a singer-songwriter. On October 11, 2005, the RCMP raided the Sorbara Group offices as part of the Royal Group Technologies investigation. The police warrant stated that there were reasonable grounds to believe Sorbara and other directors of Royal Group defrauded the company and shareholders when they bought land in Brampton, that was owned by a subsidiary of the Sorbara Group. Sorbara initially resisted opposition calls for him to step down, but later resigned as Minister of Finance the same day. In 2017, Sorbara and family donated $5 million to the construction efforts of the Mackenzie Vaughan Hospital.

Political career
In the 1985 provincial election Sorbara ran as the Liberal in the riding of York North, a suburban riding north of Toronto. He defeated Progressive Conservative incumbent William Hodgson by 4,100 votes. The Liberals under David Peterson were able to form a minority government after this election, and Sorbara was appointed Minister of Colleges and Universities and Minister of Skills Development on June 26, 1985.

Sorbara was re-elected in the redistributed riding of York Centre in the 1987 provincial election. On September 29, 1987, he became Minister of Labour with responsibility for Women's Issues. Following a cabinet shuffle in August 1989, he became Minister of Consumer and Commercial Relations.

In 1990 the Liberals were upset by the New Democratic Party in the election which followed, though Sorbara won in his riding.

1992 leadership race
On November 14, 1991, Sorbara announced that he was joining the race to replace Peterson as leader of the party. He stated, "We have to stop this province's slide into a low-wage, no-growth economy," and spoke of infrastructure investment. During the convention which was held in Hamilton, Ontario on February 9, he finished third on the first ballot, and remained in this position until dropping from the race after the fourth ballot. Sorbara subsequently refused to support either Murray Elston or Lyn McLeod (the eventual winner) on the fifth and final ballot. and did not seek re-election in 1995.

Sorbara supported Dalton McGuinty's successful bid for the provincial party leadership at the 1996 leadership convention. He did not run in the 1999 provincial election, but was elected Party President over Alvin Curling in November 1999.  He later won a 2001 by-election in the redistributed Greater Toronto Area riding of Vaughan—King—Aurora, defeating Progressive Conservative candidate Joyce Frustaglio by almost 10,000 votes. Sorbara delivered a statement in May 2010, supporting the minority Muslim sect, Ahmadiyya, who were recently attacked in Lahore for practicing their faith.

Minister of Finance
The Liberals won the 2003 election, and Sorbara was appointed Minister of Finance in the Ontario Cabinet on October 23, 2003.

Sorbara became involved in a conflict-of-interest controversy not long after his appointment.  In late 2003, the Ontario Securities Commission informed Sorbara's office that Royal Group Technologies would be announcing they were under investigation by the OSC. As a former director of Royal Group, this placed Sorbara in a conflict of interest as he also oversaw the OSC.  Sorbara could not consult the Premier concerning the conflict of interest as he was restricted by the province's Securities Act from informing anyone else of the impending announcement by the company.  Royal Group did not announce the investigation for almost two months.

There were calls for Sorbara to resign after the controversy became public knowledge, but he was cleared of any wrongdoing by the provincial integrity commissioner in August 2004.

On May 18, 2004, Sorbara released the McGuinty government's first budget. The centrepiece was a controversial new Health Premium of $300 to $900, staggered according to income. This violated a key Liberal campaign pledge not to raise taxes, and gave the government an early reputation for breaking promises. The Liberals defended the premium by pointing to the previous government's hidden deficit, and McGuinty claimed he needed to break his campaign pledge on taxation to fulfill his promises on other fronts. This broken promise has created a lasting public relations difficulty for the Liberal Party.

The Ontario Health Premium also became a major issue in the early days of the 2004 federal election, called a week after the Ontario budget. Most believe that the controversy hampered Liberal Prime Minister Paul Martin's bid for re-election.

Also controversial was the elimination of coverage for health services not covered by the Canada Health Act including eye examinations and physical therapy. Other elements of the McGuinty government's first budget were a four-year plan to tackle the deficit left behind by the Conservatives, free immunization for children, investments in education and investments to lower waiting times for cancer care, cardiac care, joint replacement and MRI and CT scans.

On May 11, 2005, Sorbara delivered his second budget. The flagship of the budget was the "Reaching Higher" plan. Investing $6.2 billion over four years, the plan increased accessibility for low-income students with loans and grants while funding more enrollments, expanded medical school spaces, and invested in new faculty, graduate scholarships and research.

The budget also projected breaking a vow to balance the future 2007–08 budget. Sorbara instead aimed at balance in 2008–09.

Sorbara also moved to expand infrastructure spending by encouraging Ontario's large pension plans to invest in the construction of new roads, schools and hospitals. Specific projects in the budget included a 10-year expansion of the TTC and Go Transit, 15,000 new affordable housing units and improved border crossings. NDP leader Howard Hampton described this move as "privatization by stealth."

After a cabinet shuffle on June 29, 2005, Sorbara was also named as the Chair of the Management Board of Cabinet.

Sorbara was re-elected to the Legislature in the 2007 election, and subsequently on October 26, 2007, he announced that he no longer wanted to sit in Cabinet, citing he wanted to devote more time for his constituents and his family.

Electoral record

Bibliography 
  The Battlefield of Ontario Politics (2014) Dundurn Press

References

External links

1946 births
Canadian people of Italian descent
Chancellors of York University
Finance ministers of Ontario
Living people
Lawyers in Ontario
Members of the Executive Council of Ontario
Ontario Liberal Party MPPs
Osgoode Hall Law School alumni
Politicians from Toronto
York University alumni
21st-century Canadian politicians